Olešnice may refer to places in the Czech Republic:

Olešnice (Blansko District), a town in the South Moravian Region
Olešnice (České Budějovice District), South Bohemian Region
Olešnice (Hradec Králové District), Hradec Králové Region
Olešnice (Rychnov nad Kněžnou District), Hradec Králové Region
Olešnice (Semily District), Liberec Region
Olešnice v Orlických horách, Hradec Králové Region